Childs is a surname. Notable people with the surname include:

Amy Childs (born 1990), English television personality and model
Barney Childs (1926–2000), American composer
Barry and Sally Childs-Helton, American singer/songwriters
Billy Childs (born 1957), American composer and jazz pianist
Brevard Childs (1923–2007), American Biblical scholar
Chris Childs (disambiguation), several people
Cupid Childs (1867–1912), American Major League baseball player
David Childs (born 1941), American architect 
David Childs (born 1933), British academic and political historian
David L. Childs, American computer scientist
Earle Childs (1893–1918), American submariner
Ebenezer Childs (1797–1864), American pioneer
Euros Childs (born 1975), Welsh singer/songwriter
George William Childs (1829–1894), American publisher
Jeremy Childs, American actor and writer
John Childs (disambiguation), several people
Joe Childs (1884–1958), French-born, British-based flat racing jockey
Joseph Childs (1787–1870), English soldier and penal administrator
Lee Childs (born 1982), English tennis player
Lucinda Childs (born 1940), American dancer/choreographer
Marquis Childs (1903–1990), American journalist
Mary Ellen Childs (born 1957), American composer
Mary Louise Milliken Childs (1873–1936), American philanthropist
Morris Childs (born Moishe Chilovsky, 1902–1991), Russian-born communist double agent
Ozro W. Childs (1824–1890), American horticulturalist
Roy Childs (1949–1992), American critic and essayist
Ted Childs (born 1934), British television producer, screenwriter and director
Thomas Childs (1796–1853), American soldier
Toni Childs (born 1957), American singer/songwriter
Tracey Childs (born 1963), English actress
William Harold Joseph Childs (1905–1983), British physicist
Yoeli Childs (born 1998), American basketball player

See also
Child (surname) 
Chiles (surname) 

English-language surnames